Western Circle (trading as Cashfloat) is a British payday loan company offering "short-term, high-cost credit". The interest charged by the lender is 277.40% pa. The interest is non-compound, as dictated by the FCA. The company declare an APR of 1116% but also claim that the APR measurement is irrelevant for non-compound loans. Currently, the firm operates in the UK market only. The company claims to be technology oriented, and develops its own decision making algorithms.

Consumer credit suppliers were regulated in the UK by the Office of Fair Trading (OFT) until April 2014, but are now regulated by the new Financial Conduct Authority (FCA). The firm's activity under the OFT was too small to cause any headlines, and hence didn't get direct criticism like much more active companies, such as Wonga. The current activity of the company is allied to the strict regulations of the FCA. The new regulations force much fairer practices in comparison to the period of 2014, and hence no significant complaints arrived to the media.

The NHS Nurses publication 
In October 2016, Western circle published a research based on survey done of 160,000 of clients, claiming that the sector of NHS Nurses is heavily dependent on Payday Loans. According to the research, the number of nurses using payday loans has doubled in 3 years, since 2013. This research brought the matter of the small wages given to the nurses in UK to the attention of media outlets. The claims were that nurses' salaries were frozen for more than 6 years, in some cases, and caused them much financial distress. The matter of the NHS continues to be an important issue of public discussion in the UK.

See also
Credit union
Wonga
Dollar Financial Group
Money Gap Group
Satsuma Loans

References

British companies established in 2014
2014 establishments in England
Payday loan companies
Online financial services companies of the United Kingdom